Pediomelum cuspidatum (also known as Psoralea cuspidata) is a perennial herb also known as the buffalo pea, largebract Indian breadroot and the tall-bread scurf-pea. It is found on the black soil prairies in Texas. It has an inflorescence on stems 18-40 centimeters long arising from a subterranean stem and deep carrot-shaped root that is 4–15 cm long. The long petioled leaves are palmately divided into 5 linear-elliptic leaflets that are 2-4 centimeters long. The flowers, borne in condensed spikes from the leaves, are light blue and pea-like.

Cultivation and uses
Pediomelum cuspidata emerges in late Spring, and sets few seeds, unlike its smaller, fecund cousin Pediomelum hypogaeum.
The species has edible tuberous roots, although some sources describe it as 'bitter'.

References
 Delena Tull (1987), Edible and Useful Pants of Texas and the Southwest, pgs 86-87
 H.D. Harrington (1967), Edible Native Plants of the Rocky Mountains, pg 206

Psoraleeae
Medicinal plants
Root vegetables
Edible legumes
Flora of Texas